Richard Rosenthal may refer to:

 Richard P. Rosenthal, writer, law enforcement officer, Chief of police
 Rick Rosenthal (born 1949), American film director
 Dick Rosenthal, American basketball player
 Richard H. Rosenthal, former owner of F&W Publications Inc., and spouse of Lois Rosenthal